The Stadio Gino Alfonso Sada is a multi-purpose stadium in Monza, Italy, and the home of Fiammamonza. Mostly used for football matches, the stadium was built in 1945 and has a capacity of 2,000.

History

In 1945, following World War II, the "San Gregorio" field was built on the parade ground of the former Gioventù Italiana del Littorio (GIL),. It was inaugurated on 21 October, with Monza's 2–0 friendly win over Pavia. Following Monza's promotion to the Serie B in 1951, a grandstand and stands were built, and the stadium was promptly renamed "Stadio Città di Monza"; the supporters, however, continued calling it with its traditional name.

In 1965, the stadium was renamed "Stadio Gino Alfonso Sada", in honour of the deceased former president of Monza. The club's last game at the "Sada" was played on 11 June 1988, in the away game of the 1987–88 Coppa Italia Serie C final against Palermo, which Monza won 2–1.

References

Bibliography
 
 
 

Sada
Buildings and structures in Monza
Multi-purpose stadiums in Italy
Sports venues in Lombardy
A.C. Monza
Sports venues completed in 1945
Sport in Monza